Norbert Isidore Joseph Hougardy (1 November 1909 – 3 January 1985) was a Belgian liberal politician. Hougardy was a commercial director and municipality Council member in Sint-Genesius-Rode. He became senator (1956 –) for the PVV and also a member of the European Parliament. Together with Milou Jeunehomme he was President of the PVV-PLP in 1968–1969.

Sources
 Presidents of the Belgian liberal party

1909 births
1985 deaths
Belgian politicians
People from Etterbeek